Valley Medical Center may refer to the following hospitals:

 Santa Clara Valley Medical Center in San Jose, California
 Valley Hospital Medical Center in Las Vegas, Nevada
 Willamette Valley Medical Center in McMinnville, Oregon
 Valley Medical Center Heliport

See also
 Valley Hospital (disambiguation)
 Medical centers named after valleys:
 Arkansas Valley Regional Medical Center
 Cagayan Valley Medical Center
 Chino Valley Medical Center
 Lehigh Valley Hospital–Cedar Crest
 Lompoc Valley Medical Center
 Ohio Valley Medical Center
 Pascack Valley Medical Center
 Queen of the Valley Medical Center
 San Luis Valley Regional Medical Center
 Star Valley Medical Center
 UCHealth Yampa Valley Medical Center
 Utah Valley Hospital